Dickinson Air Force Station is a closed United States Air Force General Surveillance Radar station. It was closed in 1965.

History 
Dickinson Air Force Station came into existence as part of Phase III of the Air Defense Command Mobile Radar program. On October 20, 1953 ADC requested a third phase of twenty-five radar sites be constructed.  It became active in April 1959.

The 706th Aircraft Control and Warning Squadron activated with AN/FPS-3 search and AN/FPS-6A height-finder radars, and initially the station functioned as a Ground-Control Intercept (GCI) and warning station.  As a GCI station, the squadron's role was to guide interceptor aircraft toward unidentified intruders picked up on the unit's radar scopes.   A second AN/FPS-6A height-finder radar was added in 1960.

During 1961 Dickinson AFS joined the Semi Automatic Ground Environment (SAGE) system, initially feeding data to DC-20 at Malmstrom AFB, Montana.  After joining, the squadron was re-designated as the 706th Radar Squadron (SAGE) on 15 July 1961.  The radar squadron provided information 24/7 the SAGE Direction Center where it was analyzed to determine range, direction altitude speed and whether or not aircraft were friendly or hostile.  By 1963 the radars had been upgraded to AN/FPS-66 search and AN/FPS-90 height-finder radars, and on 31 July 1963, the site was redesignated as NORAD ID Z-177.

In addition to the main facility, Dickinson operated three unmanned AN/FPS-18 Gap Filler sites:
 Glendive, MT     (TM-177A) 
 Alexander, ND    (TM-177B) 
 McIntosh, SD     (TM-177C) 
All three Gap Filler sites remain with both the radar towers and support structures intact.  The Alexander site is now home to the Watford City Joint Surveillance System (ARSR-4) LRR site (Z-300/J-76).

Dickinson was removed from service on 1 March 1965. The 706th Radar Squadron (SAGE) was inactivated 25 June 1965.

Today the station is abandoned, being demolished.

Buildings and facilities 
Buildings on the station include:

 Family Housing
 Club and Gymnasium
 Telephony Kiosk
 Search Radar Tower
 Height Finder Radar Tower
 (3) Radomes
 Heating Plant
 Bachelor Officers Quarters (BOQ)
 Barracks
 Operations Building
 Squadron Headquarters building
 Administration building
 Power building (also known as the "Diesel Building")

One interesting fact about the main station is that the family housing area is approximately one mile west of the operations buildings.

Air Force units and assignments

Units
 706th Aircraft Control and Warning Squadron
 Activated at Malmstrom AFB, Montana, (P-83) on 8 December 1957 (not manned or equipped)
 Assigned to Dickinson AFS on 1 July 1958
 Redesignated 706th Radar Squadron (SAGE) on 15 July 1961
 Discontinued and inactivated on 25 June 1965

Assignments:
 29th Air Division, 1 July 1958
 Minot Air Defense Sector (Manual), 1 January 1961
 Great Falls Air Defense Sector, 25 June 1963 - 25 June 1965

See also 
 List of USAF Aerospace Defense Command General Surveillance Radar Stations
 List of United States Air Force aircraft control and warning squadrons

References 

  Cornett, Lloyd H. and Johnson, Mildred W., A Handbook of Aerospace Defense Organization  1946 - 1980,  Office of History, Aerospace Defense Center, Peterson AFB, CO (1980).
 Winkler, David F. & Webster, Julie L., Searching the Skies, The Legacy of the United States Cold War Defense Radar Program,  US Army Construction Engineering Research Laboratories, Champaign, IL (1997).
 Information for Dickinson AFS, ND

External links
US Air Defense Radar museum

Installations of the United States Air Force in North Dakota
Semi-Automatic Ground Environment sites
Aerospace Defense Command military installations
Buildings and structures in Stark County, North Dakota
Dickinson, North Dakota
1959 establishments in North Dakota
1965 disestablishments in North Dakota
Military installations established in 1959
Military installations closed in 1965